This list of fossil fishes described in 2013 is a list of new taxa of placoderms, fossil cartilaginous fishes and bony fishess of every kind that have been described during the year 2013. The list only includes taxa at the level of genus or species.

Newly named jawless vertebrates

Newly named acanthodians

Newly named placoderms

Cartilaginous fishes

Research

 Reassessment of the anatomy of Helicoprion and a study on the phylogenetic relationships of this taxon is published by Tapanila et al. (2013).
 Fossils of cladodontomorph chondrichthyans (a falcatid, a ctenacanthiform and cladodontomorphs of uncertain phylogenetic placement) are described from the Early Cretaceous (Valanginian) of France by Guinot et al. (2013); this is the most recent known record of cladodontomorphs, increasing the fossil record of this group by circa 120 million years.

New taxa

Bony fishes

Research
 A specimen of the aspidorhynchid Belonostomus tenuirostris with preserved fossilized content of its digestive tract is described by Kogan & Licht (2013).

New taxa

References

Lists of animals
2010s in paleontology
Paleontology
2013 in paleontology